Sam Gallagher may refer to:
 Sam Gallagher (Australian rules footballer), Australian rules footballer.
 Sam Gallagher (footballer, born 1995), English footballer.
 Sam Gallagher (soccer, born 1991), Australian footballer.

See also
 Sam Gallacher (born 1904), Scottish footballer.